Nature Reviews Physics is a monthly peer-reviewed scientific journal published by Nature Portfolio. It was established in 2019 as an online-only journal. The editor-in-chief is Iulia Georgescu.

Scope 
The journal publishes reviews, perspective, roadmap, technical review, expert recommendation, comment, year in review,  viewpoint, and feature in all areas of fundamental and applied physics. Specific materials of interest will include, but are not limited to:
 Atomic, molecular and optical physics
 Biophysics
 Condensed matter and materials physics
 Fluid dynamics
 General physics
 Gravitation, cosmology and astrophysics
 High-energy physics (particles and fields, accelerators and beams)
 Mathematical physics
 Networks
 Nonlinear dynamics
 Nuclear physics
 Photonics
 Physical chemistry
 Plasma physics
 Polymers and soft matter
 Quantum mechanics, information and technologies
 Software and data analysis
 Statistical physics
 Techniques and instrumentation
 Physics and society, and history of physics

Impact factor 
According to the Journal Citation Reports, the journal has a 2021 impact factor of 36.273, ranking it 3rd out of 161 journals in the category "Physics, Applied" and 2nd out of 86 journals in the category "Physics, Multidisciplinary".

References

External links 
 

Physics journals
Nature Research academic journals
Publications established in 2019
Monthly journals
English-language journals
Review journals